Boeng Prolit is a commune (sangkat) in Prampir Makara District, Phnom Penh, Cambodia.

Melanie Brew of the Phnom Penh Post stated that it has an "L" shape, that it is "lush and leafy", and that it is in proximity to Boeng Keng Kang I (BKK1).

Population
The population includes Cambodian, Chinese, Vietnamese, and other foreigners.

Education
Brew stated that international schools in proximity include British International School of Phnom Penh, Home of English, ICan British International School, International School of Phnom Penh (ISPP), and Zaman International School.

References

Sangkats of Phnom Penh